The Orenburg gas field is a natural gas field located in the Orenburg Oblast, Russia. It was discovered in 1966 and developed by Gazprom. It began production in 1972 and produces natural gas and natural gas condensates. The total proven reserves of the Orenburg gas field are around 62 trillion cubic feet (1770 km3).  production was expected to be around 1.7 billion cubic feet per day (49×105 m3) in 2013.

References

Natural gas fields in Russia
Natural gas fields in the Soviet Union